Joseph W. Arrasmith (August 31, 1845 – December 7, 1918) was an American politician in the state of Washington. He served in the Washington House of Representatives from 1891 to 1893 and the Senate from 1909 to 1913. He was Speaker of the House from 1893 to 1895.

References

Republican Party Washington (state) state senators
Republican Party members of the Washington House of Representatives
1845 births
1918 deaths
19th-century American politicians
People from Putnam County, Indiana
People from Palouse, Washington